The Children is a play written by Lucy Kirkwood which premiered in London in 2016 and then on Broadway in 2017.

Premise
The play concerns two retired nuclear physicists, the married couple Hazel and Robin, who live in a remote cottage on the British coast. The world outside is dealing with a major disaster at a nuclear power station. They are visited by Rose, who is also a nuclear physicist.

The event that served as the inspiration for the play was the 2011 Fukushima nuclear explosion in Japan.

Productions
The play premiered in London at the Royal Court Theatre, running from 17 November 2016 through 14 January 2017. The cast featured Francesca Annis, Deborah Findlay, and Ron Cook, directed by James Macdonald.

The play premiered on Broadway, produced by the Manhattan Theatre Club with the same cast, running at the Samuel J. Friedman Theatre from 28 November 2017 to 4 February 2018. 
Direction was again by James Macdonald. The play received two Tony Award nominations, for Best Play and Best Featured Actress in a Play (Findlay).

The Australian co-production by the Melbourne Theatre Company and the Sydney Theatre Company won the 2018 Helpmann Award for Best Play. Its director, Sarah Goodes, won the 2018 Helpmann Award for Best Direction of a Play and Pamela Rabe won the 2018 Helpmann Award for Best Female Actor in a Play.

A production of the play ran in Toronto at the Canadian Stage Theater from September 25 to October 21, 2017. The Steppenwolf Theatre in Chicago ran a production of the play, directed by Jonathan Berry, from April 18 to June 9, 2019.

The Houston premiere of the play, directed by Brandon Weinbrenner, ran at Rec Room Arts from November 9 to December 7, 2019.

Reception
In 2019, writers for The Guardian placed The Children third on a list of the greatest theatrical works since 2000.

References

External links 
 Internet Broadway Database

2016 plays
Broadway plays
Children
Apocalyptic literature